Hong Kong Practical Shooting Association (HKPSA) is the Hong Kong region for practical shooting under the International Practical Shooting Confederation.

External links 
 Official homepage of Hong Kong Practical Shooting Association

References 

Regions of the International Practical Shooting Confederation
Sports organisations of Hong Kong
Sports organizations established in 1989
1989 establishments in Hong Kong